Calamotropha leptogrammellus, the grass webworm, is a moth in the family Crambidae. It was described by Edward Meyrick in 1879. It is found in Australia, where it has been recorded from Western Australia, the Northern Territory, Queensland, New South Wales and Victoria.

References

External links
 

Crambinae
Moths described in 1879
Moths of Australia
Taxa named by Edward Meyrick